Leptomesosa langana is a species of beetle in the family Cerambycidae. It was described by Maurice Pic in 1917, originally under the genus Mesosa. It is known from Vietnam and China.

References

Mesosini
Beetles described in 1917